Venneslafjorden is a lake in the municipality of Vennesla in Agder county, Norway.  The  lake is locate along the river Otra.  There are several islands and islets located in the northern part of the lake, the largest of which is Drivenesøya. The village of Vennesla is located along the southern end and there are also settlements that extend along the east side of the lake.  The lake is dammed as a reservoir for the Hunsfos hydropower plants.

References

Vennesla
Lakes of Agder
Reservoirs in Norway